Convolvulus equitans, commonly known as Texas bindweed, is a species of morning glory. It is native to the central and western United States and Mexico.

References 

equitans
Plants described in 1839